Tony François (born 11 April 1971) is a Mauritian international footballer who plays as a striker. He won five caps and scored one goal for the Mauritius national football team between 1998 and 2006.

Career statistics

International goals

References

External links

1971 births
Living people
Mauritian footballers
Mauritius international footballers
Mauritian Premier League players
Pamplemousses SC players
Association football forwards
AS Rivière du Rempart players
Mauritian football managers
Mauritius national football team managers